City West Link is a link road in Sydney, Australia. It makes up a section of the A44 between Leichhardt, Haberfield and Five Dock. As such, it provides an alternative route to Parramatta Road into the Sydney central business district from the Inner West. It is part of the A44 corridor. It was bypassed by the WestConnex project when the project was completed in 2023.

History

Construction
The City West Link, much to the disappointment of some local residents, simply involved the upgrade of existing roads and streets to at least four lanes. The process was carried out in four stages:
Stage One: (December 1991) An underpass beneath Victoria Road opened.
Stage Two: (February 1993) Upgrades from The Crescent at Rozelle to Catherine Street at Lilyfield, using Brenan Street. This section used a temporary one-way system to deliver traffic to Lilyfield Road.
Stage Three: (May 1995) Dobroyd Parade and Wattle Street reconstruction was completed, providing four lanes between Parramatta Road and Hawthorne Canal, parallel to Iron Cove and Iron Cove Creek.
Stage Four: (December 2000) Extended the road from Catherine Street to Dobroyd Parade. A new bridge was constructed over Hawthorne Canal. The City West Link then became part of Metroad 4 (now A4), relieving a congested section of Parramatta Road.

The project is in some ways very similar to the South Eastern Arterial link in Melbourne. That road was built between two freeways and ultimately had to be rebuilt without traffic signalled at-grade intersections. The only difference between the two is that the available space for the Melbourne road allowed the conversion without any land resumption, whereas the City West Link Road is surrounded by properties which are in places only a few feet from the road edge. Like so many other new road projects in Sydney, the available land space and cash resources available lead to either too few traffic lanes or at-grade intersections.

Post-Opening
Motorists began complaining early in 2004 that the road had already become congested, less than four years after opening. The road ultimately feeds into Parramatta Road, thus congestion points on Parramatta Road have simply been moved to different areas rather than relieved altogether.

In 2005, a major bottleneck at the eastern end was removed. Previously eastbound traffic on the link had to merge from two lanes into one, just before joining Victoria Road west of the Anzac Bridge. There are now two lanes from the west link merging with the three from Victoria Road, to make four lanes over the Anzac Bridge.

Connection to M4
After the opening of City West Link, the Roads & Traffic Authority had plans to connect the City West Link to the M4 motorway, completely bypassing Parramatta Road. Included in the project was the removal of the at-grade intersections on the City West Link for through traffic. The plan was complicated, and involved building bridges for the City West Link Road to pass over at-grade intersections, some of which made provision for only one traffic lane in each direction. Residents and advocacy groups voiced fears that this would worsen current congestion problems. The whole project was cancelled in late 2004

In the 2010s, the project was revived as the WestConnex project that involved a tunnel being built instead. The first part of the tunnel, known as M4 East, opened to the western end of the City West Link in July 2019. An extension of this tunnel opened on 20 January 2023, but it will not be usable to replace the City West Link until ramps at the Rozelle interchange are completed in late 2023.

See also

References

External links

Live Traffic NSW camera

Highways in Sydney